The 1985 NCAA Division I Men's Golf Championships were contested at the 47th annual NCAA-sanctioned golf tournament for determining the individual and team national champions of men's collegiate golf at the Division I level in the United States.

The tournament was held at the Grenelefe Country Club in Haines City, Florida.

Defending champions Houston won the team championship, the Cougars' record sixteenth NCAA title.

Clark Burroughs, from Ohio State, won the individual title.

Individual results

Individual champion
 Clark Burroughs, Ohio State

Team results

Finalists

Missed cut

DC = Defending champions
Debut appearance

References

NCAA Men's Golf Championship
Golf in Florida
NCAA Golf Championship
NCAA Golf Championship
NCAA Golf Championship